Rigside is a small village in South Lanarkshire, Scotland, about  from the town of Lanark, and less than  from Douglas Water. It lies on the A70 road to Ayr, and has approximately 800 inhabitants.

Rigside is a former mining village. The village has one shop a takeaway cafe and public house as well as a doctor's surgery.  The village has a very limited public transport link so most of the villagers have access to a car. The village has a nursery and primary school, both located on Muirfoot Road next to the recently upgraded play park and skate park.

The houses in the village are heated in order by ASHP,  coal, oil, and LPG. There is no mains gas in the village.

There is a mixture of both private and council owned houses which are being upgraded to ASHP from solid fuel.

References

External links

 Rigside website
 Gazetteer of Scotland entry

Villages in South Lanarkshire
Mining communities in Scotland